Gentle may refer to:
 Gentleness

People
 Johnny Gentle, stage name of John Askew (born 1936), British pop singer who once toured with the Silver Beetles (later the Beatles) as his backing group
 Peter Gentle (born 1965), Australian rugby league footballer and coach
 Mensur Suljović (born 1972), Austrian darts player, nicknamed "The Gentle"

Arts, entertainment and media
 Gentle (film), a 1960 Russian drama
 Gentle (character), a mutant in Marvel Comics

Biology
 GENtle, free molecular biology software
 Gentle (maggot), the larva of a blowfly

See also
Gentile (disambiguation)
Gently (disambiguation)